Gavril Radomir (anglicized as "Gabriel Radomir"; died 1015) was the emperor (tsar) of the First Bulgarian Empire from October 1014 to August or September 1015. He was the son of tsar Samuel (r. 997–1014).

Biography

During his father's reign, his cousin Ivan Vladislav and Ivan's entire family were all sentenced by Samuel to death for treason. Gavril's intervention saved at least his cousin. He is said to have saved his father's life in the disastrous defeat of the Battle of Spercheios, and he was described as a gallant fighter.

Around the same time that Emperor Basil II captured the bulk of Samuel's army, Gavril and his forces defeated the army of Theophylact Botaneiates. Having inherited Samuel's war with the Byzantine Empire, Gavril Radomir raided Byzantine territory, reaching as far as Constantinople. However, the Byzantines secured the assistance of Ivan Vladislav, who owed his life to Radomir. Vladislav murdered Radomir while hunting near Ostrovo, and then took the throne for himself.

Some sources connect Gavril Radomir with the medieval dualist sect, Bogomilism, a popular heretic movement that flourished in the Bulgarian region of Kutmichevitsa during his and his father's reign. Gavril married twice. His possible son Peter Delyan played a role in attempting to secure independence for Bulgaria several decades later.

Ian Mladjov inferred that Agatha, the wife of Edward the Exile, was granddaughter of Agatha Cryselia, daughter of Gavril Radomir, by his short-lived first marriage to a Hungarian princess thought to have been the daughter of Duke Géza of Hungary. According to the Polish–Hungarian Chronicle, that princess was Adelaide, the daughter of Doubravka of Bohemia and Mieszko I of Poland.

Family tree

See also
History of Bulgaria
Cometopuli dynasty
Bitola inscription

Sources
 История на българската държава през средните векове, Том I. История на Първото българско царство. Част II. От славянизацията на държавата до падането на Първото царство (852—1018). Васил Н. Златарски 4.Приемниците на цар Самуил и покорението на България от Василий II Българоубиец.

Footnotes

10th-century births
1015 deaths
11th-century Bulgarian emperors
Eastern Orthodox monarchs
Bulgarian people of Armenian descent
Cometopuli dynasty
Murdered Bulgarian monarchs
Bulgarian people of the Byzantine–Bulgarian Wars
Burials at the Church of St Achillios (Lake Prespa)
Sons of emperors